Cerro Gordo (also Cerrogordo) is an unincorporated community in Cerro Gordo Township, Lac qui Parle County, Minnesota, United States.

Notes

Unincorporated communities in Lac qui Parle County, Minnesota
Unincorporated communities in Minnesota